Alabaster is a name applied to certain minerals, mainly gypsum (a hydrous sulfate of calcium) and calcite (a carbonate of calcium). 
Alabaster may also refer to:

Places
 Alabaster, Alabama
 Alabaster Township, Michigan

Literature
 Alabaster (manga), a 1970 manga by Osamu Tezuka
 Alabaster (short story collection), a book containing stories by Caitlín R. Kiernan

Music
 "Alabaster", a song by Emma Pollock from her 2016 album In Search of Harperfield
 "Alabaster", a song by Foals from Total Life Forever
 "Alabaster", a song by Rend Collective Experiment from Homemade Worship by Handmade People
 "Alabaster", a song by All Them Witches from their 2017 album Sleeping Through the War
 "Alabaster", a song by Andrew Huang from his 2019 album Alabaster

Other uses
 Alabaster (surname), an English surname
 Alabaster Box (disambiguation)
 Alabaster Stone, a character of oral tradition, also found in The Cragmont Chronicles
 Inquisitor alabaster, a sea snail species
 Lake Alabaster

See also